The Söderledstunneln ("South Way Tunnel")  is a tunnel between the Central Bridge and the Johanneshov Bridge on the island of Södermalm in Stockholm. It is 1,550 metres long and traverses the island from north to south.

Building started on 9 October 1984. On the stretch between Brännkyrkagatan and Folkungagatan an earlier tunnel called Södergatan had been built in 1944 in a cut-and-cover trench. Between 1964–1966, it was extended 150 metres under Åsö High School.

At the start of the 1980s, the decision was taken to build a tunnel to alleviate the congestion south of Högbergsgatan, and then to rebuild the existing northern tunnel. Work finished on schedule in January 1991.

The tunnel is actually two tubes of 7.25 metres wide apiece, with each carrying two lanes of traffic. The height is 4.5 metres, with 110 metres of the length cut out of the rock and the rest being concrete lined.

Gallery

1984 establishments in Sweden
Road tunnels in Sweden
Buildings and structures in Stockholm
Transport in Stockholm
Tunnels completed in 1991